Brandon Elefante is an American politician serving as a member of the Hawaii Senate for the 16th district. He was elected to office on November 8, 2022.

Early life and education 
Elefante was born and raised in Aiea, Hawaii. He earned a Bachelor of Science degree in economics from Saint Mary's College of California in 2008 and a Master of Business Administration from the Chaminade University of Honolulu in 2011.

Career 
Elefante began his career as a high school teacher and coach before working on the staff of City Councilman Breene Harimoto and State Senator Will Espero. He was elected to the Honolulu City Council in 2014. He was elected to the Hawaii Senate in 2022.

References 

Living people
Democratic Party Hawaii state senators
Saint Mary's College of California alumni
Chaminade University of Honolulu alumni
Honolulu City Council members
People from Honolulu
People from Honolulu County, Hawaii
Politicians from Honolulu
People from Hawaii
Year of birth missing (living people)